Edmundo Emmanuel Ríos Jáuregui (born May 12, 1979, in Mexico City) is a former Mexican professional footballer who played for Tapachula of Ascenso MX on loan from Celaya.

References

External links

Liga MX players
Living people
1979 births
Footballers from Mexico City
Mexican footballers
Association football goalkeepers
Tampico Madero F.C. footballers
Club Celaya footballers
San Luis F.C. players
Salamanca F.C. footballers
Tecos F.C. footballers
Alacranes de Durango footballers
Atlético San Luis footballers
Cafetaleros de Chiapas footballers